Telalginite is a structured organic matter (alginite) in sapropel, composed of large discretely occurring colonial or thick-walled unicellular algae such as Botryococcus, Tasmanites and Gloeocapsomorpha prisca. Telalginite is present in large  algal bodies. It fluoresce brightly in shades of yellow under blue/ultraviolet light. The term of telalginite was introduced by Adrian C. Hutton of the University of Wollongong.

See also
Lamalginite

References

Sedimentology
Organic minerals
Petrology